George S. Everly Jr., PhD, ABPP (born May 31, 1950) is an American psychologist whose writings greatly shaped the fields of psychological crisis intervention and human resilience. He currently holds, or has held, academic posts as Professor in Psychology, Professor in Public Health, and associate professor in Psychiatry and Behavioral Sciences Loyola University Maryland, The Johns Hopkins University School of Medicine, and The Johns Hopkins Bloomberg School of Public Health.

Career

In the late 1980s, together with Jeffrey T. Mitchell, PhD, Everly founded the International Critical Incident Stress Foundation (ICISF), an education and training organization dedicated to reducing the adverse impact of trauma and burnout within the emergency services professions worldwide. In 1997, ICISF was admitted to the United Nations as a non-governmental organization under the auspices of the Economic and Social Council, one of the six principal organs of the United Nations.

From 1988 to 1992, Everly served as Chief Psychologist and Director of Behavioral Medicine at the Johns Hopkins Homewood Hospital Center in Baltimore.

Career in government consulting 

As a consultant he was a member of the CDC Mental Health Collaboration Committee (having chaired the mental health competency development sub-committee), the Infrastructure Expert Team within the US Department of Homeland Security, the Peer Support Team for the US Bureau of Alcohol, Tobacco, Firearms and Explosives, and the NVOAD Emotional and Spiritual Care Committee.

International teaching appointments 

He has held honorary or visiting professorships at the University of Hong Kong, Universidad de Flores, and Universidad Norbert Weiner (Peru).

Books 

Everly co-authored over 20 textbooks. With Daniel Girdano, he authored Controlling Stress and Tension (Prentice-Hall), perhaps the first college stress management textbook in 1977.

In 1989, he authored A Clinical Guide to the Treatment of the Human Stress Response (Plenum), the first text to integrate the psychophysiology of stress with specific treatment guidelines. Both of these seminal texts are still in print. Writing with Jeffrey T. Mitchell, Everly wrote Critical Incident Stress Management, the first textbook on a comprehensive systems' approach to psychological crisis intervention.

In 1995, Everly co-authored the groundbreaking text "Psychotraumatology" with Jeffrey Lating wherein they coined the term (Springer Publishing, 1995).

His 2007 book Pastoral Crisis Intervention paved the way for the integration of clergy into disaster mental health response. His 2008 book The Resilient Child (DiaMed) won ForeWord Magazine's gold medal for Book of the Year in Parenting.

His work with US Navy SEALs and other highly resilient people culminated in his 2015 book Stronger (AMACOM). While on faculty at the Johns Hopkins' Center for Public Health Preparedness, Everly developed the Johns Hopkins' RAPID model of psychological first aid, one of the world's first evidence-based psychological first aid models. His book The Johns Hopkins Guide to Psychological First Aid, is published by the Johns Hopkins Press

The Johns Hopkins online course Psychological First Aid authored by Everly is ranked as one of the most popular online courses of all time

Honors and awards
 Director's Award, Bureau of Alcohol, Tobacco, And Firearms (U.S. Department of Justice), 2019
 Honorary Professorship, Universidad de Flores, Buenos Aires, Argentina, 2005
 Honorary Professorship, Universidad Norbert Weiner, Lima, Peru, 1997
 Susan Hamilton Award, Interagency Collaboration in Disaster Response (ICISF), 2013
 New York City Police Department, World Trade Center Response Recognition, 2002
 Port Authority Police, World Trade Center Rescue and Recovery Recognition, 2002
 University of Maryland's 50th Anniversary Outstanding Alumni Award, Health and Human Performance (Public Health), 1999
 Achievement Award, Critical Incident Stress Foundation Association of Australia, 2000.
 Fellow's Medal, Academy of Consultation-Liaison Psychiatry
 Fellow, American Psychological Association
 The Certificate of Honor from the Baltimore Police Department
 The Honor Award from the American Red Cross
 The Leadership Award from the American Red Cross
 The Maryland Psychological Association's Award for Scientific Contributions to Psychology

References 

20th-century American psychologists
Loyola University Maryland faculty
Johns Hopkins University faculty
Johns Hopkins Bloomberg School of Public Health faculty
American consultants
1950 births
Living people
21st-century American psychologists
20th-century American physicians
21st-century American physicians